Patrick Condon (born 1950 in Brockton, Massachusetts) is a Canadian urban designer, planner, professor, and the author of several planning books in sustainability and public engagement.

Education and career 
Condon studied architecture at the University of Massachusetts Amherst.
He then worked as a city planner in Westfield Massachusetts, before taking a tenure track position at the University of Minnesota, Twin Cities, Department of Landscape Architecture. He was granted tenure at that University in 1990.

In 1992 he moved to Canada, taking a position as Chair of the UBC Landscape Architecture Program  University of British Columbia. In 1996 he assumed the UBC Chair in Landscape and Livable Environments, a position he still holds. He was promoted to full professor by UBC in 2006.

Books 
Condon is the author of books including
Design Charrettes for Sustainable Communities (Island Press, 2007)
Seven Rules for Sustainable Communities (Island Press, 2010)
Five Rules for Tomorrow's Cities; Design in an age of Urban Migration, Demographic Change, and a Disappearing Middle Class (Island Press, 2020)

References

External links 
 Bio

Academic staff of the University of British Columbia Faculty of Applied Science
Canadian non-fiction writers
Living people
Green thinkers
1950 births
University of Massachusetts Amherst alumni
University of Minnesota faculty
People from Brockton, Massachusetts
New Classical architects